Mano Po Legacy is a Filipino drama series franchise produced by Regal Entertainment and broadcast by GMA Network.

Overview

See also
 Mano Po film series

References

External links
 

2022 Philippine television series debuts
Filipino-language television shows
GMA Network drama series
Television shows set in the Philippines
Live action television shows based on films